Alice Vera Cecilia Charlotta Schmiterlöw (19 July 1904, Varberg – 9 September 1987, Stockholm) was a Swedish actress. She studied drama at the Dramaten from 1921 to 1924, where she met classmate Greta Garbo with whom she grew a lifelong friendship. The intimate correspondence between the two are saved in the National archives of Sweden. From 1927 to 1932 she mainly worked in Germany where she appeared in a number of films. Vera Schmiterlöw is the half-sister of artist Bertram Schmiterlöw.

Filmography

External links 
 

1904 births
1987 deaths
Swedish film actresses
Swedish silent film actresses
20th-century Swedish actresses
People from Varberg